Stanene is a topological insulator, theoretically predicted by Prof. Shoucheng Zhang's group at Stanford, which may display dissipationless currents at its edges near room temperature. It is composed of tin atoms arranged in a single layer, in a manner similar to graphene. Stanene got its name by combining stannum (the Latin name for tin) with the suffix -ene used by graphene. Research is ongoing in Germany and China, as well as at laboratories at Stanford and UCLA.

The addition of fluorine atoms to the tin lattice could extend the critical temperature up to 100 °C. This would make it practical for use in integrated circuits to make smaller, faster and more energy efficient computers.

See also
Graphene
Silicene
Boron
Stannenes (Similar name to Stanene)
Stannane (similar name as Stanene, too)
Semiconductors
Topological Insulator
Superconductivity
Superconductors

References

External links

 
 
 
 

Superconductors
Tin
Nanomaterials